Face à l'opinion was a  French political television show hosted by Pierre Corval and broadcast on RTF, from October 20, 1954, to 1956.

Premise

The show format is based on the American news show Meet the Press where the politicians were questioned on live television by journalists, it was the first type of programme of its kind on French television.

The show was cancelled by Guy Mollet because he who was concerned  about a  programme on the legislative elections.

References

1954 French television series debuts
1956 French television series endings
French-language television shows
1950s television news shows